San Ignacio Río Muerto is a small town surrounded by San Ignacio Río Muerto Municipality in the southwest of the  Mexican state of Sonora.

Health and education
There were 54 schools and one small health clinic in 2000.

Economic Activity
Agriculture covered 35,000 productive hectares (2000), most of which were irrigated.  Main crops are  wheat, garbanzo beans, cártamo, sorghum, watermelon, chile and melons.  Agricultural production is transported to Ciudad Obregón for packing and export to the United States.

Cattle raising was carried out on a small scale and there were more than 6,000 head in 2000.

References
 Enciclopedia de los Municipios de Mexico
 INEGI

External links
San Ignacio Río Muerto, Ayuntamiento Digital (Official Website of San Ignacio Río Muerto, Sonora)
 Gobierno de Sonora

Populated places in Sonora